KD Kasturi is the lead ship of Kasturi-class corvette of the Royal Malaysian Navy (RMN). She were acquired in the 1980s and served under 22nd Corvette Squadron of RMN and based in Lumut Perak. Kasturi is based on HDW's FS 1500 design.

Construction and career 
In 2009, Kasturi underwent an extensive modernisation known as Service Life Extension Program (SLEP) to enabling her to be employed for another 10 to 15 years. The SLEP program comprised extensive upgrade to the ship to aimed at both extending their service life and improving combat capabilities. The TACTICOS Combat Management System from Thales replaced the older Signaal SEWACO MA command system. The DR3000S Electronic Support Measures suite including the Therma SKWS Decoy Launching System was installed. In addition the DA-08 search radar and the WM22 fire control radar were overhauled and the Thales MIRADOR electro-optical sensor replaced the Signaal LIOD optronic director. For anti-submarine warfare, a DSQS-24C hull-mounted sonar from Atlas Elektronik was installed to complement the new torpedo-launch capabilities.

In 2021, KD Kasturi undergoing refit in Boustead Heavy Industries Corporation.

References

Kasturi-class corvettes
Corvettes of Malaysia
1983 ships
Corvettes of the Cold War